Lo's Diary is a 1995 novel by Pia Pera, retelling Vladimir Nabokov's 1955 novel Lolita from the point of view of  "Dolores Haze (Lolita)".

It depicts Dolores as a sadist and a controller of everyone around her; for instance, she enjoys killing small animals. It also says that Dolores did not die in childbirth, Humbert Humbert did not kill Quilty, and that all three are still alive. Most notably, the novel takes the interpretation of Humbert as being unattractive or repulsive: he even loses his teeth at one point.

Reception 
Reception was mixed to negative, with critics agreeing that it did not live up to the source material. Entertainment Weekly said it "drags down Nabokov's blackly satiric vision, set in atomic-age suburban America, to the level of a cynical 1990s teen sex comedy".

Kirkus Reviews considered it "a mix of wit and tedium in near-equal parts". Publishers Weekly found it to be "compelling", with "Nabokov's subtle and elegant prose" being replaced by an "authentic adolescent tone"; Time, however, felt that the prose was "undistinguished" and "far too precocious and knowing for even the brightest kid".

Legal issues

In 1998, Dmitri Nabokov (Vladimir's son, and executor of his father's literary estate) sued to stop the publication of the book in England, France, and the United States, claiming copyright infringement. Farrar, Straus and Giroux cancelled their planned publication pending the outcome of the lawsuit; eventually, a settlement was reached whereby Nabokov would contribute a preface to the book and receive half the royalty payments with a $25,000 advance (which he donated to PEN International).

See also

 The Wind Done Gone

References

External links
 New York Times review
 Roh, David S. "Two Copyright Case Studies from a Literary Perspective" Law and Literature  22, no. 1 (2010): 110-41. Accessed April 16, 2021. doi:10.1525/lal.2010.22.1.110.

1995 novels
Works about Lolita
Parallel literature